Cyrtodactylus wayakonei is a species of gecko, a lizard in the family Gekkonidae. The species is indigenous to southeastern Asia.

Etymology
The specific name, wayakonei, is in honor of Laotian conservationist Sengdeuane Wayakone.

Geographic range
C. wayakonei is found in northern Laos and in Yunnan Province in southern China.

Habitat

Description

Reproduction
The mode of reproduction of C. wayakonei is unknown.

References

Further reading
Nguyen TQ, Kingsada P, Rösler H, Auer M, Ziegler T (2010). "A new species of Cyrtodactylus (Squamata: Gekkonidae) from northern Laos". Zootaxa 2652: 1–16. (Cyrtodactylus wayakonei, new species).
Yuan S-Q, Rao D-Q (2011). "A new record of a Gekkonid (Cyrtodactylus wayakonei) from Yunnan, China". Zoological Research 32: 684–688.

Cyrtodactylus
Reptiles described in 2010